The 1938 Scottish Cup Final was played on 23 April 1938 at Hampden Park in Glasgow and was the final of the 60th Scottish Cup. East Fife and Kilmarnock contested the match. Following a 1–1 draw, the match was replayed on 27 April 1938, at the end of normal time the score was 2–2. East Fife, managed by David McLean, then went on to win the match 4–2 to win their only Scottish Cup.

Match details

First match

Teams

Replay

Teams

References

External links
SFA report first match
SFA report replay

1938
Cup Final
East Fife F.C. matches
Kilmarnock F.C. matches
1930s in Glasgow
April 1938 sports events